Maksim Tanko (born 18 March 1994) is a Belarusian professional footballer.

On 6 August 2020, the BFF banned Tanko from Belarusian football for 2 years for his involvement in the match fixing.

References

External links 
 
 

1994 births
Living people
Belarusian footballers
Association football goalkeepers
FC Belshina Bobruisk players
FC Khimik Svetlogorsk players
People from Babruysk
Sportspeople from Mogilev Region